Félix Antonio Doubront [doo-bront'] (born October 23, 1987) is a Venezuelan pitcher who is a free agent. He played in Major League Baseball for the Boston Red Sox, Chicago Cubs, Toronto Blue Jays and Oakland Athletics in a span of six seasons from 2010 through 2015. He also has pitched for the Lotte Giants of the KBO League and the Uni-President Lions of the Chinese Professional Baseball League (CPBL).

Professional career

Minor leagues
Doubront was 17 years old when he entered the minors in 2005 with the VSL Red Sox (rookie), playing for them one year before joining the GCL Red Sox (rookie, 2006), Lowell Spinners (A–, 2006–2007), Greenville Drive (A, 2007–2008) and Lancaster JetHawks (A+, 2008). His most productive season came in 2008, when he posted a combined 13–9 record with a 3.76 ERA in  innings of work.

Boston Red Sox

Doubront made his Major League debut on June 18, 2010, against the Los Angeles Dodgers, pitching five innings, allowing three earned runs, two walks, and struck out two for the win. It was a spot start and Doubront was optioned back to Pawtucket after the game. He was recalled on July 5 after Clay Buchholz joined a long list of Red Sox players to go on the disabled list. Doubront made two more starts and lost both of them before being optioned on July 17. He was recalled August 6, and returned to the Red Sox roster as a reliever.

Doubront entered the 2012 season as one of the Red Sox starters, beating out Aaron Cook and Alfredo Aceves in spring training. Despite slow starts for Josh Beckett, Clay Buchholz and Jon Lester, and Daniel Bard's demotion to the minors, Doubront earned five wins against two losses in his first ten starts. In June, Doubront took a no-hitter into the sixth inning against the Miami Marlins. He finished the game giving up two runs on three hits and earned the win. He ended the season as a full-time starter, with a record of 11–10.

Doubront turned in another effective season in 2013, posting an 11–6 record over 27 starts for a Red Sox team that would win 97 games and a World Championship. Doubront pitched out of the bullpen in the postseason, earning his first career postseason victory in Game 4 of the 2013 World Series.

Doubront struggled to start the 2014 season. In May, he left a game after experiencing discomfort in his left shoulder, later attributed to hitting it on a car door. He would later lose his spot in the starting rotation due to his inconsistency. He criticized the decision, stating "First of all, I’m not a reliever... They [the Red Sox] know that. They just, you know, it’s hard but I don’t know what they’re doing. I know they’re not doing the right thing for me." To begin the 2014 season, Doubront's record was 2–4 with a 6.07 ERA in 17 games (10 starts).

Chicago Cubs
On July 30, 2014, Doubront was traded to the Chicago Cubs for a player to be named later (Marco Hernández). He was placed on the disabled list on August 1 without having pitched for the Cubs. He was activated from the disabled list on August 30. In 4 more starts, Doubront posted a 3.98 ERA with a 2–1 record. Overall in 2014, combined with both teams, Doubront's record was 4–5 with a 5.54 ERA in 21 appearances (14 starts).

The Cubs released Doubront on March 28, 2015.

Toronto Blue Jays
On April 2, 2015, Doubront signed a minor league contract with the Blue Jays, and was assigned to the Triple-A Buffalo Bisons. On May 13, he was activated off the disabled list and made his Bisons debut, pitching five shutout innings and allowing only one hit and one walk. Doubront was called up by the Blue Jays in early July, and made his debut for the team pitching 2 relief innings against the Detroit Tigers on July 3. He made his first start for the Blue Jays on July 7, pitching 6 innings and getting the win against the Chicago White Sox, 2–1. Doubront was designated for assignment on July 29. In 5 games (4 starts), Doubront went 1–1 with a 4.76 ERA.

Oakland Athletics
On July 31, 2015, Doubront was traded to the Oakland Athletics for cash considerations. Finishing the season with the Athletics, Doubront made 11 appearances (8 starts) with a 2–2 record and a 5.81 ERA. Overall in 2015, his total record was 3–3 with a 5.50 ERA in 16 appearances (12 starts).

On April 11, 2016, it was revealed that Doubront would undergo Tommy John surgery and miss the entire 2016 season.

Doubront was outrighted to the Triple-A Nashville Sounds on October 7, 2016, and he then elected free agency.

In November 2016, Doubront re-signed with Oakland on a minor league contract. He elected free agency on November 6, 2017.

Lotte Giants
On December 14, 2017, Doubront signed a one-year, $1 million contract with the Lotte Giants of the KBO League. Doubront made just three starts and posted a 13.50 ERA in  innings. Afterwards, he was placed on waivers in September 2018.

Pericos de Puebla
On February 14, 2019, Doubront signed with the Pericos de Puebla of the Mexican League. He was released on May 3, 2019.

Saraperos de Saltillo
On May 14, 2019, Doubront signed with the Saraperos de Saltillo of the Mexican League.

Uni-President Lions
On January 5, 2021, Doubront signed with the Uni-President Lions of the Chinese Professional Baseball League. He posted a 7–3 record with a 3.42 ERA and 67 strikeouts over 84.1 innings. Doubront was not re-signed for the 2022 season and became a free agent.

Saraperos de Saltillo (second stint)
On February 15, 2022, Doubront re-signed with the Saraperos de Saltillo of the Mexican League. In 15 starts, he registered a 6–5 record with a 5.28 ERA and 71 strikeouts over 76.2 innings. Doubront was released on February 24, 2023.

Scouting report
Doubront's main pitches are a four-seam and two-seam fastball that range between 90 and 95 mph. He also throws a cut fastball (87–89), a big curveball (76–80), and a changeup (85–88) that is used mostly against right-handed hitters. His deceptive delivery results in hitters not being able to pick up the ball until late. The late pick-up also makes his fastball look faster to opposing hitters.

Awards
2005 - BRS Minor League Latin pitcher of the month (July)
2005 - BRS Minor League Latin pitcher of the year
2006 - BRS prospects All-Star (LH starting pitcher)
2008 - BRS prospects pitcher of the week (July 28 - August 3)
2008 - BRS prospects pitcher of the week (August 18–24)
2008 - BRS prospects All-Star (starting pitcher)
2008 - South Atlantic League All-Star
2009 - Portland Sea Dogs Pitcher of the Year
2013 - World Series champion

See also

 List of Major League Baseball players from Venezuela

References

External links

1987 births
Living people
Boston Red Sox players
Buffalo Bisons (minor league) players
Chicago Cubs players
Greenville Drive players
Gulf Coast Red Sox players
Iowa Cubs players
KBO League pitchers
Lancaster JetHawks players
Lotte Giants players
Lowell Spinners players
Major League Baseball pitchers
Major League Baseball players from Venezuela
Mexican League baseball pitchers
Nashville Sounds players
Navegantes del Magallanes players
Oakland Athletics players
Pawtucket Red Sox players
People from Carabobo
Pericos de Puebla players
Portland Sea Dogs players
Saraperos de Saltillo players
Tennessee Smokies players
Toronto Blue Jays players
Uni-President Lions players
Venezuelan expatriate baseball players in Canada
Venezuelan expatriate baseball players in Mexico
Venezuelan expatriate baseball players in South Korea
Venezuelan expatriate baseball players in Taiwan
Venezuelan expatriate baseball players in the United States
Venezuelan Summer League Red Sox/Padres players